Events from the 13th century in Denmark.

Monarchs 

 Canute VI, 1170–1202
 Valdemar II of Denmark, 1202–1241
 Eric IV, 1241–1250
 Abel, 1250–1252
 Christopher I of Denmark, 1252–1259
 Eric V of Denmark, 1259–1286
 Eric VI of Denmark, 1286–1319

Events 

 1218 – Pope Honorius III gives Valdemar II the right to annex Estonian land as part of the Livonian crusade.
 1219 – Valdemar II establishes the Danish Duchy of Estonia.
 15 June 1219 – Estonians attack occupying Danish forces in Tallinn at the Battle of Lyndanisse. According to legend, the Dannebrog fell from the sky during the battle.
 1221 – Estonians attack the Danish stronghold in Tallinn at the Siege of Tallinn. After 14 days, the Estonian forces retreated.
 22 July 1227 – Danish forces are defeated at the Battle of Bornhöved by the County of Holstein and the Hanseatic League. As a result, Holstein gains independence from Denmark.
 7 June 1238 – the Treaty of Stensby is signed between Valdemar II and the Teutonic Order, stipulating the division of Estonian lands.
 1275 – Erik V agrees to assist Magnus Birgersson in overthrowing King Valdemar Birgersson of Sweden for an agreed sum of 6,000 silver marks.
 1276 – after taking the throne, Magnus Birgersson, now King Magnus III of Sweden, refuses to pay the agreed sum to Eric V. In the fall of 1276, Magnus III moves Swedish forces into Halland and Skåne, beginning the 6,000-Mark War.
 1278 – a peace agreement is reached between Denmark and Sweden, ending the 6,000-Mark War. The agreement stipulated that Magnus III pay reparation totaling 4,000 marks.
 6 July 1289 – King Eric II of Norway sails into the Øresund with outlaw Danish nobles, beginning the War of the Outlaws
 7 July 1289 – Eric II's forces set fire to Helsingør before sailing to Copenhagen where they are defeated at the Battle of Copenhagen
 9 July 1289 – Eric II's forces again set fire to the islands of Ven and Amager before they are defeated at the Battle of Skanör

Births 

 1207 – Canute, Duke of Estonia (died 1260)
 1218 – Abel, King of Denmark (died 1252)
 1219 – Christopher I of Denmark (died 1259)
 1235 – Erik Knudsen Skarsholm (died 1303)
 1241 – Sophia of Denmark, Queen of Sweden (died 1286)
 1246 – Jutta of Denmark
 1249 – Eric V of Denmark (died 1286)
 1252 – Abel, Lord of Langeland (died 1279)
 1274 – Eric VI of Denmark (died 1319)
 29 September 1276 – Christopher II of Denmark (died 1332)
 1277 – Martha of Denmark, Queen of Sweden (died 1341)

Date unknown

 c. 1200 – Ingerd Jakobsdatter (died 1258)
 c. 1200 – Helena Pedersdatter Strange (died c. 1255)
 c. 1209 – Valdemar the Young (died 1231)
 c. 1216 – Eric IV of Denmark (died 1250)
 c. 1244 – Ingeborg of Denmark, Queen of Norway (died 1287)
 c. 1260 – Jens Grand (died 1327 in Avignon
 c. 1262 – Valdemar IV, Duke of Schleswig (died 1312)
 c. 1265 – Agnes of Denmark (died c. 1290)
 c. 1282 – Canute Porse the Elder (died 1330)
 c. 1290 – Eric II, Duke of Schleswig (died 1325)

Deaths 

 21 March 1201 – Absalon (born c. 1128)
 6 April 1203 – William of Æbelholt (born 1125 in France)
 1204 – Esbern Snare (born 1127)
 1205 – Saint Anders of Slagelse
 24 May 1212 – Dagmar of Bohemia (born c. 1186 in Meissen)
 1218 – Niels, Count of Halland
 8 May 1220 – Richeza of Denmark, Queen of Sweden (born c. 1190)
 27 March 1221 – Berengaria of Portugal (born c. 1198 in Portugal)
 1228 – Anders Sunesen (born c. 1167)
 28 August 1231 – Eleanor of Portugal, Queen of Denmark (born c. 1211 in Portugal)
 28 November 1231 – Valdemar the Young (born c. 1209)
 28 March 1241 – Valdemar II of Denmark (born 1170)
 2 April 1244 – Henrik Harpestræng
 10 August 1250 – Eric IV of Denmark (born c. 1216)
 29 June 1252 – Abel, King of Denmark (born 1218)
 1258 – Ingerd Jakobsdatter (born c. 1200)
 29 May 1259 – Christopher I of Denmark (born 1219)
 1260 – Canute, Duke of Estonia (born 1207)
 27 May 1272 – Eric I, Duke of Schleswig
 18 February 1274 – Jakob Erlandsen (died on Rügen)
 1275 – Valdemar III, Duke of Schleswig
 2 April 1279 – Abel, Lord of Langeland (born 1252)
 22 November 1286 – Eric V of Denmark (born 1249)
 December 1293 – Stig Andersen Hvide
 1294 – Rane Jonsen

Date unknown

 c. 1220 – Saxo Grammaticus (born c. 1150)
 c. 1290 – Agnes of Denmark (born c. 1265)

References 

 
Centuries in Denmark